A cabinet of curiosities was an encyclopedic collection of types of objects whose categorical boundaries were, in Renaissance Europe, yet to be defined.

Cabinet of curiosities may also refer to:

Literature 
 The Cabinet of Curiosities, a 2002 novel by Douglas Preston and Lincoln Child
A Case of Curiosities,  a 1992 novel by Allen Kurzweil
Cabinet of Natural Curiosities, an 18th-century zoological work by Albertus Seba

Music 
 A Cabinet of Curiosities, a 2009 set of albums by Jane's Addiction
 Cabinet of Curiosities (album), a 2014 album by The Pop Group

Other media 
Cabinet of Curiosities, a 1993 touring theatre variety production by UK's Ra-Ra Zoo
Kurios: Cabinet of Curiosities, a 2014 touring production by Cirque du Soleil
 A Cabinet of Curiosities (painting), a 1619 painting by Frans Francken II
 Guillermo del Toro's Cabinet of Curiosities, a 2022 Netflix horror anthology series
 Aaron Mahnke's Cabinet of Curiosities, a podcast featuring bizarre and unbelievable stories of the past